Pizzo Cassandra is a mountain located in Lombardy, Italy. It has an elevation of 3,226 metres (10,584 ft).

Mountains of Lombardy
Mountains of the Alps